Kahanok, Dalgan may refer to the following places in Iran:

 Kahanok (27°26′ N 59°36′ E), Dalgan
 Kahanok (27°26′ N 59°37′ E), Dalgan